Wii Party is a party video game developed and published by Nintendo for the Wii video game console. The game heavily borrows game play elements from the Mario Party series, another Nintendo franchise. It is also the first game in the Wii series that Shigeru Miyamoto did not produce. The game was released in Japan on July 8, 2010, in North America on October 3, 2010, in Australia on October 7, 2010, and in Europe on October 8, 2010. Wii Party was revealed by Satoru Iwata in a Financial Results Briefing on May 7, 2010. It received mixed to positive reviews from critics and sold 9.35 million copies worldwide as of September 2021. A sequel, Wii Party U, was released for the Wii U on October 25, 2013.

Gameplay

Wii Party features nine different game modes divided between three categories: Party Games, House Party Games, and Pair Games. Most of the game modes integrate use of Wii Partys 80 minigames. The game also offers additional modes that make exclusive use of the minigames.

Party Games

Party Games are games in which up to four players compete against one another.Board Game Island: A player rolls dice and proceeds the indicated number of steps (Miis are used as players' game pieces). The player who reaches the top of the island first wins.Globe Trot: Players turn over numbered cards and move the indicated number of spaces. Players win coins in minigames that can be used to purchase vehicle cards to help them advance, or at airports and seaports to travel long distances. When players reach a hot spot, they can purchase a souvenir photo for 10 coins. After 10 rounds, overtime begins and the first player to reach a hot spot and take a souvenir photo ends the game, winning a bonus photo. The player who has collected the most souvenir photos at that point wins, ties are broken by number of coins.Swap Meet (Mii of a Kind in the PAL versions): Players take turns choosing a Mii from the middle to swap out with a Mii from their area. Players who collect three Miis with outfits of the same color in two different rows win points. Various bonuses are based on how Miis are matched. The player who has the most points after a set number of rounds is the winner.Spin-Off: Players take turns spinning a wheel to earn medals. Depending on where the wheel stops, players can win medals, lose medals, or add medals to the bank. Players can also win medals saved up in the bank by winning minigames. After ten rounds, overtime begins, and the game ends after ten rounds or until any player wins a Bank Battle. The player with the most medals wins.Bingo: Players check off Miis on their bingo cards that match Mii balls that drop from a large bingo machine. If a minigame ball drops from the bingo machine, players play a minigame and the winner checks off a Mii of their choice. The first player to complete a horizontal, vertical, or diagonal row gets a bingo and is the winner.

Pair Games

Pair Games are designed for two players and are either cooperative or competitive.Friend Connection: The players answer five questions before playing a cooperative minigame to test if they are a good pair or a bad pair. They get a better score if their answers to the questions are identical, and if they do well in the minigame.Balance Boat: Players work together to balance twenty Miis on the sails of a ship without tipping the ship over.Match-Up: Players match up Miis wearing shirts of the same color into pairs to score points. The color of the Mii shirts are hidden until chosen. If players fail to match up a pair, they lose their turn. Players occasionally play duel minigames against each other to win a second turn. The player with the most points at the end of the game is the winner.

House Party

House Party Games are activities that focus on the players' environments, with most of them prohibiting the use of the Wii Remote's wrist strap due to the unique ways the controller is being manipulated.  One of the games, Quick Draw, is exclusive to the Japanese version.Animal Tracker: This game involves lining up Wii Remotes so all players can reach them. An animal comes up on screen and makes a sound, in which each Wii Remote will make an animal sound but only one of them will mimic the animal sound on the tv screen. Whoever grabs the correct Wii Remote scores a point. First to 3 points wins.Hide and Hunt: One player hides all Wii Remotes that will be used. Everyone else has a time limit to search for all of them. Every 10 seconds, each Wii Remote will make an animal sound to make locating them easier.Time Bomb: Only one Wii Remote is used regardless of number of players. Players gently pass it while holding the button shown on the screen. If the Wii Remote is shaken too much or the wrong button is pressed, the bomb will explode.Word Bomb: Only one Wii Remote is used regardless of number of players. Players pass it like it’s a bomb after saying a word that matches the given category. Whoever is holding the bomb when it explodes loses.Buddy Quiz: This game is the only one in the house category that requires 3-4 players. After choosing a player to act as the "Buddy", the other players attempt to predict the Buddy's answers to various questions about themself and get points for predicting correctly.

Minigame modesFree Play: Players play any of the minigames provided.Battle: Two or four players face off in minigames to determine who will win the most minigames.Challenge: This mode features minigames that get progressively harder for players.Solo: This is a one player minigame quest in which the player challenges five, ten or fifty minigames, to reach the rocket and attempts to last as long as they can.Spot the Sneak (Rule Reversal in the PAL version)''': A player is arbitrarily assigned to be the sneak in each minigame. The sneak is given help from the game to cheat in each minigame (such as zombies chasing everyone else besides them) but must attempt to avoid being caught using the advantage. After each round, players vote for who they suspect the sneak is, and the sneak isn’t penalized regardless of who they pick. Correctly guess and that player steals 10 to 20 points from the sneak. Incorrectly guess and the sneak steals 10 to 20 points from that player.

Development

After the development of Mario Party 8, several of Hudson Soft's key designers left to work for Nintendo subsidiary NDcube. Wii Party was first revealed to the public by Satoru Iwata during a presentation to investors at E3 2010 on May 7, 2010. In an Iwata Asks interview, NDcube said that "One of the attractions of Mario Party is that you can play with your favorite character", but they "thought that using Mii characters would strengthen the impression that you yourself are playing together with your friends." Iwata also hoped "people will play Wii Party for years to come as the new standard in party game software."

ReceptionWii Party received mixed reviews from critics, with an average Metacritic score of 68/100. GameSpot awarded Wii Party a score of 8 out of 10, praising the wide variety of minigames and modes. GameSpot also added that the game's multiplayer mode "is a blast," and believe that Wii Party is "faster and better" than Mario Party. Nintendo World Report also gave the game an 8/10, citing that "A common complaint about Mario Party is that it has too many things that slow gameplay down to a near halt, such as multiple traps on one game board and waiting for the player to finish his or her turn. Wii Party avoids this by speeding up gameplay". IGN gave the game a 7/10, criticizing the graphics as bright and colorful, but "not exactly pretty",  but praising Nintendo for doing a good job of allowing players to follow instructions to get through objectives. GameTrailers gave the game a 7.9, saying "Aside from a few dud modes and some minor control issues, there isn't a whole lot to fault."

Phil Kollar of Game Informer stated in a negative review that "Wii Party's 80-plus minigames share the same uneven quality I've come to expect from Mario Party, which makes sense given that many of them are iterations of games from that series. The metagames are even worse. Whereas Mario Party gave players multiple boards to play through, Wii Party features multiple game types, each less exciting than the last."

Sales
In its first week of release in Japan, Wii Party sold 230,000 units and was the country's best-selling game that week. As of October 5, 2010, Wii Party'' has sold 1,350,791 units in Japan. The game has sold 9.35 million copies worldwide as of September 2021. The game would go on to be rereleased by Nintendo under its Nintendo Selects collection of games.

Notes

References

External links

Official website
Official website 

2010 video games
Digital board games
Nintendo games
Nintendo Entertainment Analysis and Development games
Party video games
Touch! Generations
Wii games
Wii-only games
Multiplayer and single-player video games
Asymmetrical multiplayer video games
Video games developed in Japan
Pack-in video games
NDcube games